This article refers to the city of Taounate; for the province see Taounate Province.

Taounate (Tamazight: ⵜⴰⵡⵏⴰⵜ;) is a town in northern Morocco, and is the capital of Tawnat Province. The town had 37,616 inhabitants as of the 2014 Moroccan census.

Geography
Taounate is located in the southern Rif Mountains, and the river Oued Sra and gorges are nearby. The town is situated on a plateau that overlooks the valley of the Oued Sra, as well as the Gargara gorges.

Infrastructure
In 2016, it was announced that a highway development plan, estimated to be completed by 2035, will benefit the Taounate area, the highway being called the "Fès-Taounate Axis".

West of Taounate is the Al Wahda Dam on the Ouergha River, which is the largest dam in Morocco and the second largest in Africa.

Economy
Taounate's economy is led by the agriculture sector, specifically fig farming. In addition to figs, cherries, pears, apples, and olives are also grown.  Cattle, cereal production, and timber are important industries. Cannabis is also cultivated in the area.

Culture
The area surrounding Taounate is generally mountainous, and cereals (mostly wheat) and cattle are intensively raised at lower elevations. Fruits (including figs, olives, cherries, apples, and pears) are grown in the well-watered mountain valleys. Higher elevations are covered with commercially exploited cedars and cork oaks. The area is inhabited mostly by Imazighen (Berbers); the more isolated groups speak only Riff, an Amazigh dialect, and the less isolated groups are generally bilingual, speaking both Riff and Arabic..

Taounate is home to an annual Festival of Figs, organized by the Regional Directorate of Agriculture of Fez-Meknes. The festival includes many varieties of figs. Friday is market day in Taounate.

Union Sportive de Taounate represents Taounate in association football.

Notable people
Mustapha Bakkoury (born 1964), businessman, engineer and politician
Bouchta El Hayani, painter
Rachid Azzouzi, Former Moroccan footballer and sporting manager
Nasser Bourita, (born 27 1969), Moroccan diplomat serving as the Minister of Foreign Affairs, African Cooperation and Moroccan Expatriates 2017

Gallery

References

Cities in Morocco
Populated places in Taounate Province
Provincial capitals in Morocco